Louis Gompers (5 March 1902 – 22 October 1981) was a Dutch diver. He competed in the men's 3 metre springboard event at the 1928 Summer Olympics.

References

External links
 

1902 births
1981 deaths
Dutch male divers
Olympic divers of the Netherlands
Divers at the 1928 Summer Olympics
Divers from Amsterdam
20th-century Dutch people